The Desert 400 was a V8 Supercar motor racing event held at the Bahrain International Circuit in Manama, Bahrain. It was held from 2006 to 2008 and in 2010.

History
First held in 2006, the Desert 400 was only the second V8 Supercar championship event to be held outside Australia and New Zealand, following a single event at the Shanghai International Circuit in China in 2005. The Bahrain event was originally held in November as one of the final rounds in the season's calendar. In 2008, local Bahrain driver Fahad Al Musalam made a guest appearance in the event for Team Kiwi Racing. The 2009 event did not take place, as the scheduled event in November 2009 was postponed to February 2010 in order to link up with the new Yas V8 400 event, held in nearby Abu Dhabi.

The racing itself was dominated by Ford Performance Racing and Triple Eight Race Engineering, each winning two events at the track. Jamie Whincup was the only driver to win multiple events at the circuit, winning in 2008 and 2010 in a Triple Eight prepared Ford and Holden respectively.

Demise
In late 2010, V8 Supercars announced the event was to be discontinued for 2011, citing the congested nature of the circuit's early season schedule. V8 Supercar would maintain a presence in the Middle East until 2012, at Abu Dhabi, however the championship no longer features an event in the region.

Circuit

The series used the Bahrain International Circuit's shorter Paddock layout for the series' first three visits. For the final Desert 400 in 2010, the addition of GP2 Asia to the V8 Supercar weekend led to the event using the full Grand Prix layout for the first time, a layout normally used in the Bahrain Grand Prix.

Winners

Multiple winners

By driver

By team

By manufacturer

Event sponsors
 2008: Gulf Air

See also
 Yas V8 400
 List of Australian Touring Car Championship races

References

External links
 Official event website

Supercars Championship races
Auto races in Bahrain
Motorsport competitions in Bahrain
Recurring sporting events established in 2006
Recurring sporting events disestablished in 2010
2006 establishments in Bahrain
2010 disestablishments in Bahrain